Bass Computer is the second studio album by American Miami bass artist Techmaster P.E.B. It was released on September 1, 1991, through Newtown Records. Recording sessions took place at Midtek Studios in Sarasota, Florida. The album reached number one on the Billboard Heatseekers chart on April 25, 1992, also reaching number 132 on the Billboard 200 on June 13, 1992.

Track listing

References

External links

1992 debut albums